is a former Japanese football player and manager.

Playing career
Minobe was born in Moriyama on July 12, 1965. After graduating from high school, he joined Matsushita Electric (later Gamba Osaka) in 1984. He played many matches as mainly right side back. In 1990, the club won the champions Emperor's Cup first major title in the club history. In 1994, he moved to Japan Football League club Kyoto Purple Sanga. In 1994, he became a captain and played as regular player. In 1995, although his opportunity to play decreased, the club won the 2nd place and was promoted to J1 League. However he retired end of 1995 season without playing in J1 at the club.

Coaching career
After retirement, Minobe became a coach for Kyoto Purple Sanga (later Kyoto Sanga FC) in 1996. He managed mainly youth team until 2003. In 2004, he became a coach for top team. In October 2006, manager Koichi Hashiratani was sacked and Minobe became a new manager as Hashiratani successor. However the club results were bad and the club was relegated to J2 League. Although he stayed manager in 2007, he was sacked in October. In 2008, he signed with J2 club Tokushima Vortis and became a manager. Although the club finished at bottom place in 2008, the club results improved year after year and finished at 4th place in 2011. He resigned end of 2011 season. In 2013, he signed with Japan Football League club AC Nagano Parceiro. In 2013, he led the club won to the champions and the club was promoted to new league J3 League. In 2014, although the club finished the 2nd place, could not promoted to J2. In August 2015, although the club place was the 3rd place, he resigned for health problems.

Club statistics

Managerial statistics

References

External links
 
 

1965 births
Living people
Association football people from Shiga Prefecture
Japanese footballers
Japan Soccer League players
J1 League players
Japan Football League (1992–1998) players
Gamba Osaka players
Kyoto Sanga FC players
Japanese football managers
J1 League managers
J2 League managers
J3 League managers
Kyoto Sanga FC managers
Tokushima Vortis managers
AC Nagano Parceiro managers
Association football defenders